Neycho Ivanov Neychev (born 9 June 1930 – 1995) was a former Bulgarian basketball player. He competed in the men's tournament at the 1952 Summer Olympics.

References

External links
 

1930 births
1995 deaths
Bulgarian men's basketball players
Olympic basketball players of Bulgaria
Basketball players at the 1952 Summer Olympics
Place of birth missing
Date of death missing
Place of death missing